The Meares Glacier is a large and only tidewater glacier at the head of Unakwik Inlet in Chugach National Forest, Alaska. The glacier is one of the many in Prince William Sound, and is about 79.6 miles (128 km) east of Anchorage. The glacier is named for eighteenth century British naval captain John Meares. The face of the glacier is one mile (1.6 km) wide where it calves into the inlet. The glacier is sometimes visited by cruises from Valdez.  Meares Glacier is currently advancing.

See also
 List of glaciers

Glaciers of Alaska
Glaciers of Chugach Census Area, Alaska
Glaciers of Unorganized Borough, Alaska